Statistics of UAE Football League in season 1984/85.

Overview
Al Wasl FC won the championship.

References
United Arab Emirates - List of final tables (RSSSF)

UAE Pro League seasons
United
1984–85 in Emirati football